"Sleepwalking" is the debut single from The X Factor UK series 2 finalist, Maria Lawson.

The song features a sample of The Chi-Lites hit single "Have You Seen Her".

The track was released on 14 August 2006 and charted at number 20 on the UK Singles Chart. That same week, fellow series 2 finalist Chico also released a single. However, Lawson's track charted four places higher. "Sleepwalking" generally received positive criticism in the UK and was A-listed on BBC Radio 2. To date, the song has sold over 35,000 copies in the UK alone. The single was the first and only track to be lifted from Lawson's debut album Maria Lawson.

"Sleepwalking" also charted at number 44 in Ireland and at number 67 in Australia. However, the Australian release was released on download alone. The single's B-side is a cover of James Blunt's "You're Beautiful".

Charts

References

External links
 Youtube video for Sleepwalking.

Maria Lawson songs
2006 debut singles
Songs written by Andy McCluskey
2006 songs
Songs written by Barbara Acklin
Songs written by Eugene Record